Kamal Beyk (also Romanized as Kamāl Beyk; also known as Kamāl Bak, Kamāl Beyg, and Kamāl Bik) is a village in Jabal Rural District, Kuhpayeh District, Isfahan County, Isfahan Province, Iran. At the 2006 census, its population was 136, in 35 families.

References 

Populated places in Isfahan County